In geology, a slab window is a gap that forms in a subducted oceanic plate when a mid-ocean ridge meets with a subduction zone and plate divergence at the ridge and convergence at the subduction zone  continue, causing the ridge to be subducted. Formation of a slab window produces an area where the crust of the over-riding plate is lacking a rigid lithospheric mantle component and thus is exposed to hot asthenospheric mantle (for a diagram of this, see the link below). This produces anomalous thermal, chemical and physical effects in the mantle that can dramatically change the over-riding plate by interrupting the established tectonic and magmatic regimes. In general, the data used to identify possible slab windows comes from seismic tomography and heat flow studies.

Effects 
As a slab window develops, the mantle in that region becomes increasingly hot and dry. The decrease in hydration causes arc volcanism to diminish or stop entirely, as magma production in subduction zones generally results from hydration of the mantle wedge due to de-watering of the subducting slab. Slab-window magmatism may then replace this melting, and can be produced by multiple processes, including increased temperatures, mantle circulation producing interaction of supra- and sub-slab mantle, partial melting of subducted slab edges and extension in the upper plate. Mantle flowing upward through the slab window in order to compensate for the decreased lithospheric volume can also produce decompression melting. Slab window melts are distinguished from calc-alkaline subduction-related magmas by their different chemical compositions.
The increase in temperature caused by the presence of a slab window can also produce anomalous high temperature metamorphism in the region between the trench and the volcanic arc.

Geometry 
The geometry of a slab window depends primarily on the angle the ridge intersects the subduction zone and the dip angle of the down-going plate. Other influential factors include the rates of divergence and subduction as well as heterogeneities found within specific systems. 

There are two end-member scenarios in terms of the geometry of a slab window: the first is when the subducted ridge is perpendicular to the trench, producing a V-shaped window, and the second is when the ridge is parallel to the trench, causing a rectangular window to form.

Examples 
The North American Cordillera is a well-studied plate margin that provides a good example of the effects a slab window can have on an over-riding continental plate. Beginning in the Cenozoic, the fragmentation of the Farallon Plate as it subducted caused slab windows to open that then generated anomalous features in the North American Plate. These effects include distinct fore-arc volcanism and extension in the plate which may be a contributing factor to the formation of the Basin and Range Province. The northward younging of Pemberton Belt volcanism in southwestern British Columbia, Canada may have been related to a northward moving slab window edge under North America 29 to 6.8 million years ago.

In addition to the fossil slab windows of the Cenozoic seen in North America, there are other regions along the Pacific Rim  (e.g. in California, Mexico, Costa Rica, Patagonia and the Antarctic Peninsula) that exhibit active ridge subduction producing slab windows.

See also
 
 
 Triple junction

References

External links
 Schematic diagram of a slab window and related effects, GSA publications
 Slab gap versus Slab window, University of Colorado Western US Tectonics term project

Geological processes
Plate tectonics
Subduction